Vietnamese Quoted-Readable (usually abbreviated VIQR), also known as Vietnet, is a convention for writing Vietnamese using ASCII characters encoded in only 7 bits, making possible for Vietnamese to be supported in computing and communication systems at the time. Because the Vietnamese alphabet contains a complex system of diacritical marks, VIQR requires the user to type in a base letter, followed by one or two characters that represent the diacritical marks.

Syntax 

VIQR uses the following convention:

VIQR uses DD or Dd for the Vietnamese letter Đ, and dd for the Vietnamese letter đ. To type certain punctuation marks (namely, the period, question mark, apostrophe, forward slash, opening parenthesis, or tilde) directly after most Vietnamese words, a backslash (\) must be typed directly before the punctuation mark, functioning as an escape character, so that it will not be interpreted as a diacritical mark. For example:

 
 
 What is your name [Sir]? My name is Hiếu Văn Trần.

Software support 
VIQR is primarily used as a Vietnamese input method in software that supports Unicode. Similar input methods include Telex and VNI. Input method editors such as VPSKeys convert VIQR sequences to Unicode precomposed characters as one types, typically allowing modifier keys to be input after all the base letters of each word. However, in the absence of input method software or Unicode support, VIQR can still be input using a standard keyboard and read as plain ASCII text without suffering from mojibake.

Unlike the VISCII and VPS code pages, VIQR is rarely used as a character encoding. While VIQR is registered with the Internet Assigned Numbers Authority as a MIME charset, MIME-compliant software is not required to support it. Nevertheless, the Mozilla Vietnamese Enabling Project once produced builds of the open source version of Netscape Communicator, as well as its successor, the Mozilla Application Suite, that were capable of decoding VIQR-encoded webpages, e-mails, and newsgroup messages. In these unofficial builds, a "VIQR" option appears in the Edit | Character Set menu, alongside the VISCII, TCVN 5712, VPS, and Windows-1258 options that remained available for several years in Mozilla Firefox and Thunderbird.

History 
By the early 1990s, an ad-hoc system of mnemonics known as Vietnet was in use on the Viet-Net mailing list and soc.culture.vietnamese Usenet group.

In 1992, the Vietnamese Standardization Group (Viet-Std, Nhóm Nghiên Cứu Tiêu Chuẩn Tiếng Việt) from the TriChlor Software Group led by Christopher Cuong T. Nguyen, Cuong M. Bui, and Hoc D. Ngo in California formalized the VIQR convention. It was described the next year in RFC 1456.

See also
Vietnamese language and computers

Alternative schemes for Vietnamese:
Telex
VISCII
VNI
VPSKeys
VSCII-MNEM

ASCII mnemonics for other writing systems:
Informal romanizations of Russian
ITRANS for Devanagari
SAMPA for IPA
Volapük encoding for Cyrillic

Notes and references

External links
RFC 1456 – Conventions for Encoding the Vietnamese Language (VISCII and VIQR)
Viet-Std Group
Vietnamese Character Encoding Standardization Report – VISCII and VIQR 1.1 Character Encoding Specifications (English and Vietnamese)
The VIQR Convention
AnGiang Software
Free Online VIQR to Unicode Converter
Help page on inputting Vietnamese text in Vietnamese Wikipedia

Character encoding
Vietnamese character input